Fantasy Island is an American fantasy drama television series created by Gene Levitt. It aired on ABC from 1977 to 1984. The series starred Ricardo Montalbán as the mysterious Mr. Roarke and Hervé Villechaize as his assistant, Tattoo. Guests were granted so-called "fantasies" on the island for a price.

A one-season revival of the series aired 14 years later in 1998 while a horror-themed prequel film was released on February 14, 2020. That same year, it was announced that a reboot of the series was being produced at Fox; it premiered on August 10, 2021.

Background
Before it became a television series, Fantasy Island was introduced to viewers in 1977 and 1978 through two made-for-television films. Airing from 1978 to 1984, the original series starred Ricardo Montalbán as Mr. Roarke, the enigmatic overseer of a mysterious island somewhere near Devil's Island, French Guiana in the Atlantic Ocean, where people from all walks of life could come and live out their fantasies, albeit for a price.

Roarke was known for his white suit and cultured demeanor, and he was initially accompanied by an energetic sidekick, Tattoo, played by Hervé Villechaize. Tattoo would run up the main bell tower to ring the bell and shout "De plane! De plane!" to announce the arrival of a new set of guests at the beginning of each episode. This line, shown at the beginning of the series' credits, became an unlikely catchphrase because of Villechaize's spirited delivery and French accent. In later seasons, he would arrive in his personal go-kart, sized for him, and recklessly drive to join Roarke for the visitor reception while the staff scrambled to get out of his way. From 1981 to 1982, Wendy Schaal joined the cast as a beautiful brown-eyed blonde assistant named Julie; in the season five story "The Case Against Mr. Roarke", Roarke stated that Julie was his god-daughter. The producers dismissed Villechaize from the series before the 1983–1984 season, which ended up being its last, and Tattoo was replaced by a more sedate butler type named Lawrence, played by Christopher Hewett, who pressed an electronic button to ring the bell rather than climb the tower.

A Grumman Widgeon aircraft was used for the series. Just prior to the guests alighting from the plane, Mr. Roarke would address his assembling employees with the phrase "Smiles, everyone! Smiles!" As each visitor disembarked, Roarke would describe to Tattoo (or another assistant) the nature of their fantasy, usually with a cryptic comment, suggesting the person's fantasy will not turn out as they expected. Roarke would then welcome his guests by lifting his glass and saying: "My dear guests, I am Mr. Roarke, your host. Welcome to Fantasy Island." This toast was usually followed with a warm smile, but sometimes — depending on the nature of a guest or their fantasy — his eyes would show concern or worry for a guest's safety.

Mr. Roarke's actual age is never made clear. In the pilot film, he comments how the guests who come to his island are "so mortal" and there are hints throughout the series that suggest Roarke may be immortal. In "Elizabeth", a woman from Roarke's past appears, but it is revealed that she died over 300 years ago. Other episodes suggest that he was friends with Helen of Troy and Cleopatra. Roarke is also shown to know many seemingly immortal beings over his time on Earth, including ghosts ("The Ghost's Story"), a genie ("A Genie Named Joe"), the mermaid Princess Nyah ("The Mermaid", "The Mermaid Returns", "The Mermaid and the Matchmaker"), the goddess Aphrodite ("Aphrodite"), and Uriel the Angel of Death ("The Angel's Triangle"). In "The Devil and Mandy Breem" and "The Devil and Mr. Roarke", Roarke even faces the devil (played by Roddy McDowall) who has come to the island to challenge him for either a guest's immortal soul or his. It is mentioned this is not the first time that they have confronted each other and Mr. Roarke has always been the winner. In the second story, the devil was one of the island's guests, claiming that he was only there to relax and had no interest in Roarke's soul at the time. However, this turned out to be yet another ruse.

Roarke had a strong moral code, and he was always merciful. He usually tried to teach his guests important life lessons through the medium of their fantasies, frequently in a manner that exposes the errors of their ways, and on occasions when the island hosted terminally ill guests he would allow them to live out one last wish. Roarke's fantasies were not without peril, but the greatest danger usually came from the guests themselves. In some cases, people were killed due to their own negligence, aggression or arrogance. When necessary, Roarke would directly intervene when the fantasy became dangerous to the guest:

 In one episode when Tattoo was given his own fantasy as a birthday gift, which ended up with him being chased by hostile natives in canoes, Mr. Roarke suddenly appeared in a motorboat, snared Tattoo's canoe with a grappling hook and towed it away at high speed to help him escape.
 In the 1979 episode "The Mermaid; The Victim", a female guest seeking to fall in love with her dream man ends up as one of his sex slaves. When she and her fellow slaves manage to get free, they are saved by Mr. Roarke and Tattoo who have arrived with the police who then arrest the two men responsible.
 In the 1980 episode "With Affection, Jack the Ripper; Gigolo", a female guest intent on researching Jack the Ripper's crimes was sent back in time to 1888 London, and would have become one of the Ripper's victims had Mr. Roarke not physically intervened.

With only a few exceptions, Roarke always made it quite clear that he was powerless to stop a fantasy once it had begun and that the guests must play them out to their conclusion.

In later seasons, there were often supernatural overtones. Roarke also seemed to have his own supernatural powers of some sort (called the "Gift of the McNabs" in "Delphine"), although it was never explained how this came to be. In the episodes "Reprisal" and "The Power" he temporarily gave the guest psychokinetic abilities and in "Terrors of the Mind" the power to see into the future. In one episode, when a guest says "Thank God things worked out well", Roarke and Tattoo share an odd look and Roarke says in a cryptic way "Thank God, indeed." In the same episode, Roarke uses some mysterious powers to help Tattoo with his magic act. Ricardo Montalbán would claim in interviews that he had a definite opinion in mind regarding the mystery of Mr. Roarke, and how he accomplished his fantasies, but he would never publicly state what it was. Years after the series was off the air, in an interview with the Academy of Television Arts and Sciences, Montalbán finally revealed that his motivation was imagining Roarke as a fallen angel whose sin was pride and that Fantasy Island was Purgatory.

Each episode would alternate between two or three independent storylines as the guests experienced their fantasies and interacted with Roarke. When reruns of the series went into syndication, a half-hour version was offered, in which each hour-long original show was split to two separate half-hour shows in which only one guest's story was told in each half-hour episode. This made it obvious that the original episodes had been planned in such a way that each guest or family got off the plane separately, did not interact with the other guest or family, and was given almost exactly half the time of the original episode.

Often the fantasies would turn out to be morality lessons for the guests, sometimes to the point of (apparently) putting their lives at risk, only to have Roarke step in at the last minute and reveal the deception. For example, one episode featured a couple who clamored for the "good old days" being taken back to the Salem witch trials. It is mentioned a few times that a condition of visiting Fantasy Island is that guests never reveal what goes on there. A small number of guests decided to make the irrevocable choice to stay permanently, living out their fantasy until death; one such person was an actor who had been in a Tarzan-type television series called "Jungle Man" in the 1960s. Aside from a clip show ("Remember...When?") the only episode with a single storyline was "The Wedding", in which terminally ill Helena Marsh (Samantha Eggar) returned to Fantasy Island to spend her last days as Roarke's wife.

Another episode, season seven's "The Nurses," was the only episode where all of the fantasies, while separate, were linked by one thread. In this case, a mysterious and wealthy guest (Peter Graves) inviting three nurses to live out each of their fantasies on the island.

The fantasy

Cost 
In the first film, Fantasy Island (1977), it was noted that each guest had paid $50,000 (about $ in  dollars) in advance for the fulfillment of their fantasies and that Fantasy Island was a business. In the second film, Return to Fantasy Island (1978), Roarke told Tattoo that he sometimes dropped the price when a guest could not afford the usual fee because he believed that everyone should be given a chance to have their fantasies fulfilled. Afterwards, it became clear that the price a guest paid was substantial to him or her, and for one little girl whose father was one of Roarke's guests, she had emptied her piggy bank (which contained less than $10) to have her fantasy with her father fulfilled. On numerous occasions, a guest had not paid for the trip at all, but instead won it as a result of a contest. Those who came by winning contests were usually the unknowing beneficiaries of rigged contests in order to disguise to them and others the real reason for their coming as part of someone else's fantasy.

Nature 
The nature of a fantasy varied from story to story and was typically very personal to each guest on some level. They could be as harmless as wanting to be reunited with a lost love to something more dangerous like tracking down a cold-blooded killer who murdered someone close to the guest. Usually, the fantasy would take an unexpected turn and proceed down a quite different path than the guest expected. Some resolve in "The Monkey's Paw" style. He or she would then leave with some new revelation or renewed interest about themselves or someone close to them. Many times, Roarke would reveal in the end that someone they met during the course of their fantasy was another guest living a fantasy of their own. Both guests often left the island together. However, in one episode, one guest had no particular fantasy and was simply there to relax and enjoy himself. In another episode, the fantasy of one guest (played by Don Knotts) was to play the part of a private investigator. At the end of the episode, he discovers that his "suspects" were actually a company of actors who had asked Mr. Roarke to act out their whodunnit play in a realistic setting.

Although some fantasies were rooted in the real world, many others involved supernatural (such as ghosts, demons, or witchcraft) or mythological (mermaids, genies, goddesses) elements. Time travel was often a required element, if not a specific request, to fulfill one's fantasy.

Risk 
Roarke often preceded particularly risky fantasies with a stern warning, a word of caution, or even a suggestion that the guest select another fantasy, instead. He would then inform his guests that he was powerless to stop a fantasy once it had begun and that they must allow the fantasy to play out until its ultimate conclusion. Despite this, on rare occasions, Roarke would appear halfway through a fantasy to offer a guest one more opportunity to terminate their fantasy, warning that continuing their current fantasy might lead to serious consequences, possibly even death. However, at that point, the guest would decide on their own to see the fantasy to its end, either for selfless reasons (regarding someone they had met during the fantasy) or naivety of what is in store for them. In the most serious cases, however, Roarke would invariably intervene and ensure his guests' safety.

Occasionally, some of the fantasies would take place on adjoining islands, or on parts of Fantasy Island that, according to Roarke, he had no jurisdiction over, thereby heightening the risk factor for the guests. Even then, when Roarke intervened in these cases, he often revealed that he had close connections with the local officials or prominent figures on those islands, who would grant him permission to rescue his guests.

Episodes

Production notes 

Executive producer Aaron Spelling admitted the original pitch was a joke. Spelling said he and production partner Leonard Goldberg were pitching ideas to ABC executive Brandon Stoddard. After the executive rejected all of their plans, at least six in all, Spelling blurted out: "What do you want? An island that people can go to and all of their sexual fantasies will be realized?" Stoddard loved the idea.

The network wanted Orson Welles for Mr. Roarke, but Spelling rejected him, knowing of his irritable nature on sets. He also rejected the idea of a sexy female sidekick to join Roarke and Tattoo.

The show was broadcast every Saturday night on ABC at 10:00 p.m., after The Love Boat, which was also produced by Aaron Spelling. Like several other series of the era, such as The Love Boat and Murder, She Wrote, Fantasy Island employed many celebrity guest stars, often bringing them back repeatedly for different roles.

Filming locations 
The series was filmed primarily in Burbank, California, with the opening scenes of the enchanting island coastline being that of Kauai, Hawaii (both the Na Pali coast as well as Wailua Falls). The house with the bell tower, where Tattoo rings the bell, is the Queen Anne Cottage, located in the Los Angeles County Arboretum and Botanic Garden in Arcadia. The plane, "arriving" with the guests, was filmed in the lagoon behind the Queen Anne Cottage. Sometimes, outdoor scenes were filmed at the Arboretum.

Interior sets were filmed on Stages 26 and 17 at Warner Bros. Studios in Burbank, California. At some point, the production of exterior scenes moved to the Warner Ranch a short distance away from Warner's main lot.

Music 
The Fantasy Island theme music was composed by Laurence Rosenthal.

Other projects

1998 revival series 

In 1998, ABC revived the series in a Saturday time slot. The role of Mr. Roarke was played by Malcolm McDowell in the revival, and in contrast to the first series the supernatural aspect of his character and of Fantasy Island itself was emphasized from the start, along with a dose of dark humor. Director Barry Sonnenfeld, known for his work on The Addams Family movies, was a chief creative force on the new series. Another difference was that the new series was filmed in Hawaii instead of California. The remake followed the fantasies of at least two of Roarke's guests with an additional subplot involving members of his staff — usually Cal and Harry. Whereas the original series featured a separate writer and title for each subplot, the new series was written as several stories, but featuring a unified theme and title.

2020 horror prequel film adaptation

A horror-themed prequel film adaptation of the television series was released. Sony Pictures released the film and produced by Blumhouse Productions. Director and screenwriter Jeff Wadlow directed the adaptation from a script by Wadlow, Chris Roach, and Jillian Jacobs. The film was released on February 14, 2020, to overwhelmingly negative reviews.

2021 Fox sequel series 

A series was greenlit in December 2020 as a sequel to and maintains continuity with the original 1977 series, slated for a mid 2021 release on Fox. The series will be a co-production between Sony Pictures Television and Fox Entertainment. In April 2021, it was announced that Kiara Barnes and John Gabriel Rodriguez joined the main cast of the series. That same month, it was announced that Roselyn Sánchez joined the cast of the series as Elena Roarke, a descendant of Mr. Roarke, and the series premiered on August 10, 2021.

Syndication 
Selected episodes from the first, second and third seasons are available free at Hulu. Selected Minisodes from seasons one, three, four, five, and six are available free at Sony Crackle, along with complete episodes from seasons one, two, and three.

Digital multicast television network Cozi TV announced the series would be airing on the network beginning fall 2013. Episodes of the original series were seen on Fridays on sister cable network Universal HD, until July 2017, when the network changed to the Olympic Channel.

In Canada, the entire series with all seven seasons is available for streaming on the CTV App, with the first five seasons remastered in High Definition, the first three seasons have been enhanced to 1.78:1 aspect ratio. 

In May 2021, it was added to the streaming service Tubi, with all seven seasons.

In August 2021, it started airing on digital multicast television network getTV on Saturday and Sunday nights (4:00 AM ET).

Home media 
In 1988, Star Classics released the pilot episode of the series on VHS in the United States and Canada.

In 2005, Sony Pictures Home Entertainment released season one of the original series on DVD in regions 1, 2 & 4. The release included the 1977 pilot Fantasy Island and 1978's Return to Fantasy Island. However, due to poor sales, no further seasons were released.

In February 2012, it was announced that Shout! Factory had acquired the rights to the series in Region 1; they subsequently released the second season on DVD on May 8, 2012. Season 3 was released on October 23, 2012.

In 2013, Mill Creek Entertainment announced they had obtained the rights to re-release the previous season sets of Fantasy Island on DVD.

Notes

References

External links 
 
 
 

 
1970s American anthology television series
1970s American drama television series
1977 American television series debuts
1980s American anthology television series
1980s American drama television series
1984 American television series endings
American Broadcasting Company original programming
American fantasy television series
American television series revived after cancellation
English-language television shows
Fiction about immortality
Fictional islands
Television series by Sony Pictures Television
Television series by Spelling Television
Television series set on fictional islands
Television shows adapted into films